The women's 50 metre breaststroke event at the 11th FINA World Swimming Championships (25m) took place 12 – 13 December 2012 at the Sinan Erdem Dome.

Records
Prior to this competition, the existing world and championship records were as follows.

The following records were established during the competition:

Results

Heats

Swim-off

Semifinals

Final

References

External links
 2012 FINA World Swimming Championships (25 m): Women's 50 metre breaststroke entry list, from OmegaTiming.com.

Breaststroke 050 metre, women's
World Short Course Swimming Championships
2012 in women's swimming